p73 is a protein related to the p53 tumor protein. Because of its structural resemblance to p53, it has also been considered a tumor suppressor. It is involved in cell cycle regulation, and induction of apoptosis. Like p53, p73 is characterized by the presence of different isoforms of the protein. This is explained by splice variants, and an alternative promoter in the DNA sequence.

p73, also known as tumor protein 73 (TP73), protein was the first identified homologue of the tumor suppressor gene, p53. Like p53, p73 has several variants. It is expressed as distinct forms differing at either at the C- or the N-terminus. Currently, six different C-terminus splicing variants have been found in normal cells. The p73 gene encodes a protein with a significant sequence homology and a functional similarity with the tumor suppressor p53. The over-expression of p73 in cultured cells promotes a growth arrest and/or apoptosis similarly to p53.

The p73 gene has been mapped to a chromosome region (1p36. 2-3) a locus commonly deleted in various tumor entities and human cancers. Similar to p53 the protein product of p73 induces cell cycle arrest or apoptosis, hence its classification as a tumor suppressor. However unlike its counterpart, p73 is infrequently mutated in cancers. Perhaps, even more shocking is the fact that p73 – deficient mice do not show a tumorigenic phenotype. A deficiency of p53 almost certainly leads to unchecked cell proliferation and is noted in 60% of cancers. 		

Analyses of many tumors typically found in humans including breast and ovarian cancer show a high expression of p73 when compared to normal tissues in corresponding areas. Adenoviruses that cause cellular transformations have also been found to result in increased p73 expression. Furthermore, recent finding are suggesting that over-expression of transcription factors involved in cell cycle regulation and synthesis of DNA in mammalian cells (e.g.: E2F-1) induces the expression of p73. Many researchers believe that these results imply that p73 may not be a tumor suppressor but rather an oncoprotein. Some suggest that the TP73 locus encodes both a tumor suppressor (TAp73) and a putative oncogene (ΔNp73). This is a strong theory and causes much confusion, as it is unknown which of the two p73 variants is over-expressed and ultimately plays a role in tumorigenesis.

Genes of the p53 family are known to be complex. The viral oncoproteins (e.g. Adenovirus E1B) that efficiently inhibit p53 function are unable to inactivate p73, and those that seem to inhibit p73 have no effect on p53.

Debate persists about the exact function of p73. Recently it has been reported that p73 is enriched in the nervous system and that the p73-deficient mice, which do not exhibit an increased susceptibility to spontaneous tumorigenesis, have neurological and immunological defects. These results have been expanded and it has also been shown that p73 is present in early stages of neurological development and neuronal apoptosis by blocking the proapoptotic function of p53. This strongly implicates p73 as playing a large role in cellular differentiation.

References

External links 
 A naturally occurring p73 mutation in a p73-p53 double-mutant lung cancer cell line encodes p73α protein with a dominant-negative function

Further reading 

Proteins
Tumor suppressor genes